Jules Auguste Garcin [Salomon] (11 July 1830 – 10 October 1896) was a French violinist, conductor and composer of the 19th century.

Life
Garcin was born in Bourges. His maternal grandfather, Joseph Garcin, was director of a travelling company playing comic operas in the central and southern provinces of France.

Having entered the Paris Conservatoire in adolescence, studying under Clavel and Alard, Garcin took the Premier Prix for violin in 1853, and entered the Opéra orchestra in 1856. He became solo violinist, then third conductor in 1871, and finally chief conductor in 1885.

His long and successful teaching career at the Conservatoire de Paris began in 1875. Among his notable students were the child prodigy Henri Marteau (1874–1934) and Jules Boucherit (1877–1962).

Garcin's association with the Orchestre de la Société des Concerts du Conservatoire began in 1860, again as orchestral and then as solo violinist. In 1885, he was elected principal conductor of the Conservatoire concerts. In this post he actively promoted German choral and symphonic masterpieces, from Bach's Mass in B minor (in 1891) to works of Brahms and Wagner (Brahms's music was then the object of much adverse criticism in Paris during the Franco-Prussian War). He was a founder-member of the Société Nationale de Musique in 1871. He wrote some music (including a violin concerto and viola concertino), a certain amount of which was published by Lemoine.

Garcin also conducted the premiere of Franck's Symphony in D minor on 17 February 1889 at the Paris Conservatoire. This Symphony was dedicated to Henri Duparc, who was a member of "la bande à Franck" at the Conservatoire, along with Vincent D’Indy, Emmanuel Chabrier, and Paul Dukas. Three years later in 1892, Garcin retired and relinquished the post due to illness, but continued teaching. He died in Paris in 1896.

He performed on violins by Antonio Stradivari, the "Il Cremonese" of 1715 (now known as the Ex-Joachim), another Stradivari (Cremona, 1731) (now known as the ex-Garcin), as well as "Le Messie", a copy of 1868 by Jean-Baptiste Vuillaume.

Accomplishments
Prizes achieved include: 2nd Prix, solfège, 1843; 1er Prix 1844; 2nd Prix, violin, 1851; 1er Prix 1853.

Quotes

Selected compositions
 Chanson de Mignon, Op. 11
 Concerto for violin and orchestra, Op. 14
 Concertino for viola (or cello) and orchestra, Op. 19 (1870)
 Villanelle for violin and piano, Op. 26
 Impromptu valse for violin and piano, Op. 29
 Canzonetta
 Fantasie concertante (Coppelia)
 Scherzo for violin and piano
 Suite symphonique

References

External links
 
 Société des concerts du Conservatoire
 Cozio.com
 Provenance of the instruments made by Stradivari
 Il Cremonese del 1715
 The Garcin Stradivari of 1731
 Chamber Music sketch with Jules Garcin and Delphin Alard

1830 births
1896 deaths
19th-century classical composers
19th-century classical violinists
19th-century conductors (music)
19th-century French composers
Academic staff of the Conservatoire de Paris
Burials at Montmartre Cemetery
Chevaliers of the Légion d'honneur
Conservatoire de Paris alumni
French conductors (music)
French male classical composers
French male conductors (music)
French music educators
French Romantic composers
Musicians from Bourges